The following public artworks have been displayed in Queens, New York City:

 Benniger Memorial
 It is located in Forest Park (Richmond Hill) as a memorial for the people who fought in WW1 and died. 
 The Benniger Memorial is also called the Forest Hill War Memorial.  
 The sculpture was created by Joseph Pollia and it represents a "doughboy".  
 Civic Virtue by Frederick William MacMonnies, nude Hercules who made a scandal in City Hall Park and was banished to Kew Gardens, Queens and again to Green-Wood Cemetery, Brooklyn
 Crack of Dawn Sundial
 Cunningham Memorial Flagpole
 Dialogue with the Sun
 Education and Athletics
 The Family
 Foulk Plaque
 Four Figures Raising Arms
 Garden of Games, Gate, and Clock Tower
 Gatehouse to Knowledge
 Girl Weeding
 Girl with Fawn
 Glendale World War Memorial
 Justice Benjamin N. Cardozo
 Knowledge
 Landmind
 Long Island City World War Memorial
 Marconi Memorial
 Memorial Door, Antonio Latorraca (1938) by James Novelli
 Memorial Door, Bernard F. Golden
 Memorial Door, DeSalvio
 Memorial Door, John Lordi, Esq.
 Memorial Door, Mrs. C. LaGioia
 Morris Park War Memorial, or Morris Park World War Memorial
 P. S. 7 Botanical Sculptures and Gate
 The Pursuit of Learning
 Reach to the Stars
 Riis Memorial / Wise Clock
 Rockaway Beach World War Memorial
 Rocket Thrower by Donald De Lue, located in Flushing Meadows–Corona Park
 Thomas A. Edison
 Unisphere, a 12-story high, spherical stainless steel representation of the Earth located in Flushing Meadows–Corona Park
 Untitled by Alice Aycock
 Untitled by Jack Hastings
 Untitled (Hexagonal Sculpture)
 Vapor Trails
 Woodside War Memorial

See also
 Socrates Sculpture Park on Vernon Blvd. and Broadway in Long Island City

References

Queens
Public art in New York City